Meir ben Samuel of Shcherbreshin was a 17th-century paytan and chronicler.

In the years of taḥ ve-tat (1648–49) he lived at Shcherbreshin, Poland, an honored member of the community, from where he escaped, on its invasion by the Cossacks, to Krakow. There he published his Tzok ha-Ittim (1650), an eyewitness account, in Hebrew verse, of Jewish persecution during the Cossack uprising. This book was afterward published by Joshua ben David of Lemberg under his own name; Moritz Steinschneider was the first to discover this plagiarism.

Meir wrote also Mizmor Shir le-Yom ha-Shabbat, a Sabbath hymn in Aramaic and Yiddish (Venice, 1639; Amsterdam, 1654).

Publications

References
 

17th-century Jews
17th-century Polish poets
Hebrew-language poets
Khmelnytsky Uprising
People from Szczebrzeszyn